Zero Petroleum is a British manufacturer of non-biological renewable synthesised petroleum co-founded by former Formula One engineer Paddy Lowe. Its product has been developed as an alternative to fossil-based petroleum, fuels from waste and bio-fuels. The Royal Air Force used its fuel in November 2021 to achieve a World Record first flight powered by synthetic fuel. In July 2022, Zero entered a new partnership  with the Royal Air Force to move towards mass production of sustainable aviation fuel.

Technology
Zero uses Direct FT (a proprietary and specialised version of Fischer-Tropsch) to directly manufacture target fuels (gasoline, kerosene and diesel) at high yield and with no need for refinery upgrading.

When manufactured using renewable energy, synthetic petroleum can be used as a carbon neutral or carbon negative direct drop-in replacement for fossil fuels, particularly for operations that require high energy densities, from motorsport to farming. It can also be used as a raw material to produce various forms of plastic.

It is manufactured using a process known as petrosynthesis, in which carbon dioxide and hydrogen are combined to create hydrocarbons. The process involves direct air capture of carbon dioxide from the atmosphere and the electrolysis of water to obtain hydrogen.The carbon dioxide is converted into carbon monoxide in a Reverse Water-Gas Shift (RWGS) reactor and this combines with the hydrogen to create a ‘Syngas’ that is fed into a Fischer-Tropsch (FT) reactor to create the final hydrocarbon products. The use of renewable energy throughout the process results in the production of carbon neutral and carbon negative hydrocarbons.

History
In March 2020, Zero Petroleum Limited was founded by Paddy Lowe and Professor Nilay Shah, OBE. Lowe is a former Formula One motor racing engineer and computer scientist who achieved 12 World Championships and 158 race wins over his 32-year F1 career with Williams, McLaren and Mercedes. Shah is the Head of Imperial College London's Department of Chemical Engineering and received an OBE for services to the decarbonisation of the UK economy in 2020, including his notable work on modelling and optimising technologies for carbon capture and storage systems.

In September 2021, Zero Petroleum received capital from a Glasgow-based investment syndicate, providing funds to scale its processes. Investors included former Formula One World Champion Damon Hill.

On 2nd November 2021, the company supplied its synthetic fuel to the Royal Air Force to achieve the world's first successful flight using only synthetic fuel. The fuel was manufactured in Orkney using locally generated wind, and tide and wave energy. The aircraft, an Icarus C42 microlight, was flown around Cotswold Airport. The project was part of the RAF's Project MARTIN, through which it plans to achieve its first net-zero airbase by 2025 and a net-zero force by 2040.

In June, 2022, Lowe represented Zero Petroleum in UK Parliament at a session held to discuss the future of sustainable fuels. He was joined by F1 CEO Stefano Domenicali, Motorsport UK Chair David Richards, Mercedes F1 CTO James Allison and former F1 driver Karun Chandhok. In July 2022, the company announced its new partnership with the Royal Air Force which will see the joint development of fast jet aviation fuel.

See also

 Carbon capture and storage
 Synthetic fuel
 Synthetic fuel commercialisation
 Carbon neutral fuel
 Electrofuel

References

External Links
www.zeropetroleum.com

Companies based in London
British companies established in 2020